Hunt Club Road, also known as Ottawa Road 32, is a major east–west route in Ottawa, Ontario, Canada. It originally ran from a dead end east of Bank Street to the Ottawa Hunt and Golf Club; later, there were many extensions due to the 1970s housing boom, first westward to Riverside Drive, then eastward to Hawthorne Road in the late 1980s. The section between Bank Street and Riverside Drive, originally only one lane in each direction, was expanded to two lanes in each direction in 1993–1994. It was further extended across the Rideau River and the southern edge of the suburbs to Richmond Road by the late 1990s; this extension is signed as West Hunt Club Road by the City of Ottawa.  Construction to extend Hunt Club eastward to Highway 417 near Ramsayville was completed on August 21, 2014.

Most of Hunt Club Road is a four-lane divided principal arterial road with limited access, particularly between just west of Merivale Road and Highway 416 where it is an at-grade urban expressway. The section east of Merivale, originally a tank farm, has transformed into a major big-box retail area.

The Michael J.E. Sheflin Bridge, better known as the Hunt Club Bridge, carries the road over the Rideau River between Prince of Wales Drive (former Highway 16) and Riverside Drive. The bridge was widened over the summer of 2006, extending the left turn lanes in both directions over the full length of the bridge to alleviate congestion.

The City's Transportation Master Plan includes the widening of the road to six lanes between Highway 416 and Bank Street.

Along the road, one may find Pine Grove Park, and the Stoney Swamp Conservation Area.

Major Intersections
 Old Richmond Road 
 Moodie Drive
 Highway 416 
 Cedarview Road 
 Greenbank Road 
 Woodroffe Avenue 
 Merivale Road 
 Prince of Wales Drive extended to Prince of Wales between 1984 and 1987
 Riverside Drive 
 Airport Parkway 
 Bank Street
 Albion Road 
 Conroy Road 
 Hawthorne Road
 Highway 417

Communities
 Uplands 
 South Keys 
 Greenboro

References

External links

 Hunt Club Bridge Project Information Page

Roads in Ottawa